The Zakarids or Zakarians (Zak'aryanner), also known by their Georgian name as Mkhargrdzeli, were a noble Armenian–Georgian dynasty. A family legend says that this name was a reference to their Achaemenid ancestor Artaxerxes II the "Longarmed" (404–358 BC). According to Cyril Toumanoff / Encyclopædia Iranica, they were an offshoot of the Armenian Pahlavuni family. The Zakarians considered themselves Armenians.

History
The dynasty was of Armenians or Kurdish origins. The first historically traceable Zakarid was Khosrov. When the David IV of Georgia liberated Lori from the Seljuq grip, the Zakarids came to be vassals of the House of Orbeli. Under George III of Georgia, Sargis Zakarian was appointed as governor of the Armenian city of Ani in 1161, however it was soon recaptured by the Shaddadids. In 1177, the Zakarids supported the monarchy against the insurgents during the rebellion of Prince Demna and the Orbeli family. The uprising was suppressed, and George III persecuted his opponents and elevated the Zakarids. Sargis was granted Lori during the reign of the Tamar of Georgia in 1186.

The brothers, Zakare and Ivane Zakarian, who were sons of Sargis, were the most successful representatives of the family, who were military commanders under Queen Tamar. Zakare and Ivane took Dvin in 1193. They also took Sevan, Bjni, Amberd and Bargushat, and all the towns above the city of Ani, up to the bridge of Khodaafarin bridge. Around the year 1199, they took the city of Ani, and in 1201, Tamar gave Ani to them as a principality. Eventually, their territories came to resemble those of Bagratid Armenia. Their achievements under Queen Tamar also facilitated the first large-scale migration of Kurdish tribes to the Caucasus. However, most of the migrants eventually converted to Christianity and became fully assimilated into the Georgian society, around the same time, Ivane converted to Georgian Orthodox Christianity, while Zakare remained Armenian Apostolic in faith. The brothers commanded the Armenian-Georgian armies for almost three decades, achieving major victories at Shamkor in 1195 and Basen in 1203 and leading raids into northern Persia in 1210 and suppression of rebellions of mountaineers in 1212. They amassed a great fortune, governing all of northern Armenia; Zakare and his descendants ruled in northwestern Armenia with Ani as their capital, while Ivane and his offspring ruled eastern Armenia, including the city of Dvin.

Both brothers left several bilingual inscriptions across the Armeno-Georgian border lands and built several churches and forts, such as the Harichavank Monastery and Akhtala Monastery in northern Armenia. The family went in decline with the establishment of Mongol power in the Caucasus.

When the Khwarezms invaded the region, Dvin was ruled by the aging Ivane, who had given Ani to his nephew Shahnshah, son of Zakare. Dvin was lost, but Kars and Ani did not surrender. However, when Mongols took Ani in 1236, they had a friendly attitude towards the Zakarids. They confirmed Shanshe in his fief, and even added to it the fief of Avag, son of Ivane. Further, in 1243, they gave Akhlat to the princess T’amt’a, daughter of Ivane.

After the Mongols captured Ani in 1236, the Zakarids ruled not as vassals of the Bagratids, but rather the Mongols. The later kings of Zakarids continued their control over Ani until the 1360, when they lost to the Kara Koyunlu Turkoman tribes, who made Ani their capital.

Genealogy

References

Sources 
 
 

Zakarids